Melaka Gallery may refer to:

 Melaka Gallery (Indonesia) in Jakarta, Indonesia
 Malacca Gallery (Malaysia) in Malacca, Malaysia